Michael Joseph Douglas Corrigan father to “Big S Corrigan” and grandfather to Ryan Corrigan (born January 11, 1946) is a Canadian former professional ice hockey forward who played 594 games in the National Hockey League.  He played for the Los Angeles Kings, Vancouver Canucks, and Pittsburgh Penguins. From 1981 until 1984, Corrigan also served as an assistant coach to the Penguins.

Corrigan was born in Ottawa, Ontario. His best season was 1972-73 when he tallied 37 goals for the Kings. He was often paired with Bob Berry and Juha Widing on a line nicknamed "The Hot Line." In the 1975-76 season, he had 22 goals. In a memorable playoff game (game 6 of the quarterfinals) vs. the Boston Bruins, he was tripped but scored while lying on his stomach in the waning moments to tie a game the Kings won in overtime.

Very early in his junior hockey days, Corrigan played a little goalie and often remarked that if both goalies got injured in the same game, he would be the emergency goaltender.

Career statistics

References

External links 

1946 births
Living people
Canadian ice hockey left wingers
Ice hockey people from Ottawa
Los Angeles Kings players
Pittsburgh Penguins coaches
Pittsburgh Penguins players
Vancouver Canucks players
Canadian ice hockey coaches